Sheffield Cablevision was a cable television community channel in Sheffield, England which launched on 29 August 1973. The channel was one of five community cable television experiments that were authorised by the UK's Minister for Posts and Telecommunications in 1972. It closed on 2 January 1976 due to lack of funds.

References 
Notes

Citations

Further reading 
 
 

Community television channels in the United Kingdom
Mass media in Sheffield
Television channels and stations established in 1973
1973 establishments in England
Defunct television channels in the United Kingdom
Television channels and stations disestablished in 1976
1976 disestablishments in England